The 2006 Champ Car Grand Prix de Montreal was the eleventh round of the 2006 Bridgestone Presents the Champ Car World Series Powered by Ford season, held on August 27 and August 28, 2006 on the Circuit Gilles Villeneuve in Montreal, Quebec, Canada.

The race began on Sunday the 27th, but the race was red flagged due to excessive rain after only 6 laps were completed.  The remainder of the race was rescheduled for 10:00am the following day, with all retired cars allowed to restart in the positions they held at the time of the red flag, albeit laps down if they were on the Sunday. The final 61 laps were completed without further weather stoppages.  Sébastien Bourdais took the race win from the pole as well as a stranglehold on his third consecutive season championship with his closest competitors A. J. Allmendinger and Justin Wilson both finishing well back.

Qualifying results

Race
The restart order on Monday was as follows:

Caution flags

Notes

 New Race Record Sébastien Bourdais 2:01:09.290
 Average Speed 89.886 mph

Championship standings after the race

Drivers' Championship standings

 Note: Only the top five positions are included.

External links
 Friday Qualifying Results 
 Saturday Qualifying Results 
 Race Results

Montreal
Grand Prix of Montreal
Champ Car Grand Prix